Scott Dawson (born September 14, 1967) is an American author and preacher, and the founder of the Scott Dawson Evangelistic Association (SDEA), and of the Strength to Stand Conference movement.

Biography
Dawson was born on September 14, 1967. He graduated from Samford University earning a Bachelor of Arts, and earned a Master of Divinity from Beeson Divinity School in Birmingham, Alabama. Later in 1993, he received his ordination and certificate of gospel ministry by order of the Roebuck Park Baptist Church. He preached his first sermon at the age of 16. Shortly after, he began speaking at various churches. By the age of 20, Scott founded the evangelistic association that would come to be known as SDEA (Scott Dawson Evangelistic Association).  Since 1987, the organization has founded and directed numerous music festivals featuring Christian artists and speakers. In 2005 Scott Dawson partnered with Scott Lenning who worked as crusade director at the Billy Graham Evangelistic Association for nearly 20 years. The Scott Dawson Evangelistic Association operates out of Birmingham, Alabama, where Scott and his wife, Tarra, reside with their children Hunter and Hope.

Dawson announced he would enter the 2018 Alabama gubernatorial election on the Rick and Bubba radio show on June 5, 2017. In the 2018 Republican gubernatorial primary Dawson polled 79,546 votes at 13.46% of the general vote. He came in third place in the primary.

Drug testing all Alabama schools
As a candidate for governor Dawson has called for drug testing in all Alabama schools, a plan that would cost large amounts of money according to the American Association of Pediatrics.

Scott Dawson Conferences

Dawson and his organization founded the Strength to Stand Conference. Being held annually since 1989, the conferences, aimed at teens and young adults, feature Christian artists and speakers. Musical acts such as Lecrae, Jamie Grace  and David Crowder.

SDEA is also the parent organization behind StadiumFest, a festival which draws over 30,000 attendees annually. One Birmingham News reporter billed StadiumFest as "the largest free Christian crowd Birmingham has seen since 1986".

Writings
 Dear Lord Why?' (Scott Dawson Evangelistic Association, 2001).
 Complete Evangelism Guidebook (Baker Books, 2006).
 Evangelism Today: Effectively Sharing the Gospel in a Rapidly Changing World'' (Baker Books, 2009).

References

External links

 Official Site of Strength to Stand Conferences
 Official Site of Scott Dawson Evangelistic Association

1967 births
Living people
20th-century American male writers
20th-century Baptists
21st-century American male writers
21st-century Baptists
American evangelicals
American evangelists
Baptist writers
Leaders of Christian parachurch organizations
Performers of contemporary worship music
Samford University alumni
Southern Baptist ministers